Blessed Trinity Roman Catholic College is a coeducational Roman Catholic secondary school located in Burnley, Lancashire, England.

History
The school opened in 2006 as part of ambitious plan to replace all of the district's 11 to 16 schools, funded by a government public–private partnership programme called Building Schools for the Future. It was formed from the merger of St Theodore's Boys High School and St Hilda's Girls' High School and initially occupied split sites of the former St Hilda's and Habergham Sixth Form Centre. Bernadette Bleasdale, who had been the head of St Hilda's since 1992, became the new school's first head teacher.

Former schools
St Theodore's RC High School was a boys' 11 to 16 school with a mixed sixth form.

St Hilda's RC High School was a girls' high school, which originally opened in 1954.

History
Following an inspection by Ofsted in 2008, Blessed Trinity was awarded the status of a "good school, with outstanding elements".

Shortly after Ofsted placed the school in special measures in 2011, Bleasdale announced her retirement. Richard Varey took over as head teacher, and the school exited special measures in 2013.

New building
Demolition started on the former St Theodore's site in 2008, and the school moved into a new £24m building in 2010. The new college holds approximately 1,000 students, and will eventually hold a 1,250 capacity.

Academy
Previously a voluntary aided school administered by Lancashire County Council, Blessed Trinity converted to academy status in 2020. The school is now sponsored by the Romero Catholic Academy Trust.

Attainment

In 2007, the school's value-added measure was 1006.7 (national average 1000). In 2010, the school was again the highest performing in the borough in terms of GCSE results.

The DfE figures released in 2011 showed Blessed Trinity to be the only school in Burnley in which more than half the pupils achieved five good passes in their GCSEs, including English and Maths.

Notable former pupils

 Willem Tomlinson, footballer
 Oliver Norwood, footballer
 Lewis Mansell, footballer
 Ben McKenna, footballer
 Harvey Macadam, footballer
 Cody Frost, Singer

St Theodore's RC High School
 James Anderson, cricketer
 Stewart Binns, author and documentary maker
 Chris Casper, football manager
 Jonathan Clare, cricketer
 Vincent Fean, diplomat 
 Adam Kay, footballer
 Peter Salmon, BBC executive
 Chris Scott, footballer
 Paul Scott, footballer
 Liam Spencer, artist
 Chris Turner, footballer

References

External links
 EduBase

Schools in Burnley
Secondary schools in Lancashire
Catholic secondary schools in the Diocese of Salford
Academies in Lancashire
Educational institutions established in 2006
2006 establishments in England